The Calculated Ignition Index (CII) is an index of the ignition quality of residual fuel oil.

The running of all internal combustion engines is dependent on the ignition quality of the fuel. For spark-ignition engines the fuel has an octane rating. For diesel engines it depends on the type of fuel, for distillate fuels the cetane numbers are used. Cetane numbers are tested using a special test engine and the existing engine was not made for residual fuels. For residual fuel oil two other empirical indexes are used CII and Calculated Carbon Aromaticity Index (CCAI). Both CII and CCAI are calculated from the density and kinematic viscosity of the fuel.

Definition
Formula for CII:

 

Where:
D = density at 15°C (kg/m3)
V = viscosity (cST)
T = viscosity temperature (°C)

Use
CII was designed to give out numbers in the same order as the cetane index for distillate fuels.

Combustion